Amora Maille, also written as Amora-Maille, is a French company and brand that manufactures condiments. The company is a subsidiary of Unilever and the leading condiment maker in France. The company operates two major brands, Amora and Maille.

History 

Amora Maille was formerly headquartered in Dijon, France.

In 1999, the company had around 1,000 employees and operated plants in the communes of Dijon, Chevigny, Appoigny, Carvin and Vitrolles. The company also had a sales operation in Belgium at the time. A mustard museum was located at the Amora Maille plant in Dijon.

In 1999, Amora Maille was acquired by the multinational consumer goods company Unilever. Unilever paid $739.3 million for the company, equivalent to 460 million pounds or 716.5 million euros. The company was sold by a division of the French banking group Paribas SA, the Paribas Affaires Industrielles LBO Fund, and several other investors. The acquisition was estimated to increase Unilever's share of the European culinary market from 9% to 12%.

In 2008, Amora Maille announced that it was closing three of its plants in Dijon, laying off more than half of their workers, and concentrating their operations in Chevigny. The Dijon plant closed in 2009, some production was exported to Poland, and as of 2018 part of the company's production takes place in Chevigny-Saint-Sauveur.

Products 
The company operates two major brands, Amora and Maille.

The Amora brand sells mustard, ketchup, bouillon, salad dressing, and seasonings. The Maille brand sells mustard, sauces, olive oil, and vinegar.

Its mustard is considered a strong and pungent one, compared to other Dijon mustards.

Controversies 
In August 2018, foodwatch (a European advocacy group focused on consumer rights), accused Amora of false advertising for its "Mustard Vinaigrette" salad dressing product, which was found to contain only 0.7% mustard and mustard seeds not sourced from Dijon.

See also

 List of mustard brands
 List of brand name condiments

References 

Food and drink companies of France
French brands
Mustard brands
Unilever brands
Brand name condiments
Condiment companies
Companies based in Bourgogne-Franche-Comté